This list of television awards for Best Actor is an index to articles about "Best Actor" awards for television performances.

General

Drama

Miniseries or Television film

Musical or comedy

See also

 Best Actor
 Lists of awards
 Lists of acting awards
 List of television awards

References

 
Television, best actor